David Gwyn Francis (2 February 1896 – 7 May 1987) was a Welsh international rugby union player, who played for the Welsh national side twice (in 1919 and 1924).

Life
Francis was educated at Jesus College, Oxford, where he was part of the college rugby team that won the University of Oxford inter-collegiate cup in 1920. Francis also played for the University rugby team, winning his "Blue" in 1919. He won his first cap for Wales in 1919, playing at lock in a friendly against a New Zealand Services XV. In 1921 he took charge of Rugby at Reading School, and in 1924 captained London Welsh RFC and Surrey RFC. He won his second cap in 1924, playing against Scotland in the Home Nations Championship. He was a rugby referee for 28 years, and helped to found the Berkshire Rugby Football Union, serving as chairman for 24 years. A club room at Redingensians R.F.C. (a club that was formed for former pupils of Reading School) is named after Francis, as is a prize awarded by Berkshire rugby referees for club hospitality.

References

1896 births
1987 deaths
Alumni of Jesus College, Oxford
Gorseinon RFC players
Leicester Tigers players
Llanelli RFC players
London Welsh RFC players
Oxford University RFC players
People educated at Gowerton Grammar School
Rugby union locks
Rugby union players from Gorseinon
Wales international rugby union players
Welsh rugby union players